is a 1983 Japanese anime war drama film loosely based on the Japanese manga series of the same name by Keiji Nakazawa. Directed by Mori Masaki and starring Issei Miyazaki, Masaki Kōda and Tatsuya Jo, it depicts World War II in Japan from a child's point of view revolving around the events surrounding the bombing of Hiroshima and the main character's first hand experience of the bomb.

Barefoot Gen was dubbed by Streamline Pictures in 1995, despite the fact that it was released in the United States on June 13, 1992 and on July 3 in San Jose, California.

A sequel, Barefoot Gen 2, was released on June 14, 1986.

Plot
Gen Nakaoka and his family live in Hiroshima during the final days of World War II. The family struggles through food shortages and constant air raid warnings. Gen's mother, Kimie, is pregnant and suffering from malnutrition, and his sister Eiko helps Kimie in her housework. Gen and his brother Shinji help their father, Daikichi, in the family's wheat field and try to find food for Kimie. Daikichi and Kimie realize the war is not going well, though they wonder why Hiroshima has been spared from the air raids which devastated other Japanese cities.

One day, Gen and a friend arrive at school just as a lone B-29 aircraft flies overhead. It releases an atomic bomb which destroys almost the entire city. Gen's friend is killed in the blast while he is buried under rubble by the resulting shockwave. Gen finds Kimie in the ruined city and they try to rescue their family, who are buried alive under their burning collapsed house. However, they are unsuccessful and Daikichi urges his son to take care of Kimie and the baby. Daikichi, Eiko and Shinji burn to death as Gen and his mother watch helplessly. Kimie briefly suffers a mental breakdown, commenting that her family is burning like a bonfire. With help from a neighbor, the two find a safe location where Kimie goes into labor. Kimie gives birth to a baby girl, Tomoko. "Black rain" soon falls on the ruined city, the result of the bomb that sent radioactive material and debris into the atmosphere.

Gen spends the next few days searching for food for his family. He discovers that soldiers are distributing rice, but arrives to find them collecting corpses before burning them in mass graves. He meets a soldier who is shivering from being cold, despite the heat and he defecates and vomits blood. Gen takes him to a make-shift hospital where the soldier then dies. The doctor has no clue what caused the soldier's death. He later finds a ration storehouse containing rice, most of which has already been seared by the blast. He finds a few bags of intact rice and takes them to his mother to eat along with some fresh vegetables. Kimie points out a few bald spots on her son's head, who recollects the memory of the soldier dying from the unknown illness.

In a voice over, the narrator mentions that the US government gave Japan an ultimatum: surrender or another bomb will be dropped. When Japan refuses to surrender, the United States detonates the second atomic bomb over the city of Nagasaki, which suffers the same outcome as Hiroshima.

On August 15, Gen and Kimie dig up the remains of their family members from their former home. They learn from a nearby family that Japan has surrendered to the Allies, ending the war, but their prayers of peace came too late. They later take refuge in a makeshift shack where they try to live on what little rice they have. A small boy, Ryuta, tries to steal their rice, but Gen catches him and is shocked at Ryuta's resemblance to Shinji. Gen and Kimie take Ryuta in after learning that Ryuta was orphaned by the bomb.

The next day, Gen and Ryuta look for food as Tomoko is suffering from malnutrition. A man gives them a job tending to his ill-tempered brother Seiji, another bomb survivor, for 10 yen a day, but the boys grow tired of the mistreatment, slap Seiji several times, and quit. Seiji begs them to come back, explaining to them that he is grateful that the boys treated him like more than a rotting corpse. Gen tells Ryuta to tell his mother where they are, and he spends the night with the man, which inspires him to paint once again. The man's brother pays them 100 yen and the boys head out to find milk for Tomoko. When they return home, they find that Tomoko is already dead.

A few weeks later, Gen and Ryuta see wheat beginning to grow despite having heard that grass would not grow. With renewed optimism, Gen, his mother, and Ryuta set a paper boat lantern down the river. They then watch and pray as the boat gently sails into the sunset.

Cast

Release
Barefoot Gen was released in Japan on 21 July 1983 where it was distributed by Herald Enterprises. It was released in the United States on 13 June 1992, and dubbed by Streamline Pictures in 1995.

The Barefoot Gen anime made Time magazine's list of top five anime DVDs.

The film review aggregator website Rotten Tomatoes reported a 75% approval rating based on 8 reviews with an average rating of 7,25/10.

See also
 Barefoot Gen, the manga series upon which this film is based
 Barefoot Gen 2, the 1986 sequel to this film
 Grave of the Fireflies

References

Footnotes

Sources

External links
 
 
 

1980s war drama films
1983 anime films
1983 drama films
1983 films
Film controversies
Anime and manga controversies
Anime films based on manga
Anime
Discotek Media
Drama anime and manga
Films about nuclear war and weapons
Films about suicide
Films about the atomic bombings of Hiroshima and Nagasaki
Films scored by Kentarō Haneda
Films set in 1945
Films set in Hiroshima
Geneon USA
Historical anime and manga
Japanese World War II films
Japanese war drama films
1980s Japanese-language films
Madhouse (company)
Works about children in war

ja:はだしのゲン#アニメ映画